Sixto Ríos García (Pelahustán, Toledo, January 4, 1913 – Madrid, July 8, 2008), was a Spanish mathematician, known as the father of Spanish statistics.

Biography
The son of José María Ríos Moreiro and Maria Cristina Garcia Martin, he was taught by his parents, who were teachers. When the family moved to Madrid, he attended St. Maurice School and the IES San Isidro, being always the valedictorian.
 
In 1932 he graduated with a degree in Mathematics from the Complutense University of Madrid, with the best marks and getting the award "Premio Extraodinario", later he obtained a Ph.D. in Mathematics. He was a student of Julio Rey Pastor and the Laboratory and Seminar of Mathematics (LSM). He recalled that Esteban Terradas influenced his entry to statistics.

He became professor of mathematical analysis at the University of Valencia, as well as in Valladolid and Madrid. He also became Doctor Engineer Geographer, and  professor at the Technical School of Aeronautical Engineering and the Faculty of Economics.
 
He held the positions of Director of the School of Statistics at Complutense University of Madrid, Director of Consejo Superior de Investigaciones Científicas (CSIC) (Superior Council for Scientific Research), Director of the Department of Statistics at the Faculty of Mathematics at the Complutense University of Madrid, and president of the Spanish Statistics and Operations Research Society. He was a correspondent of the National Academy of Sciences of Argentina.

Rios published a Spanish language description of the Von Neumann–Morgenstern utility theorem.

He was a member of the editorial board of Statistical Abstracts and full member of the International Statistical Institute and the Institute of Mathematical Statistics.
 
He conducted research with or directed theses of 16 professors, and some directors in statistical bureaus of Latin America. He conducted applied research for the Spanish industry and formed the School of Operations Research. He lectured at universities around the world and presented papers at international conferences and published in international journals, and helped to set up and direct research centers such as the School of Statistics at the University of Madrid, the Institute of Operations Research and Statistics at the Spanish National Research Council (CSIC) and its journal Works on Operations Research and Statistics, the School of Statistics at the Central University of Venezuela and the Department of Statistics and Operations Research at the Faculty of Sciences, with international courses sponsored by the Organization of American States (OAS) and  UNESCO.

Rios Garcia married Maria Jesus Insua Negrao and they had a son, Sixto Rios Ensua, who followed his father's profession.

Publications
He is the author of over 200 research works, publications and monographs, on mathematical analysis, probability and statistics and operations research, among them: Statistical Methods, (Ediciones del Castillo, SA, 1967), Special Mathematics (Madrid: Paraninfo, 1972) Applied Mathematics (Madrid: Paraninfo, 1980) and Multi-criteria Decision Processes (Madrid: Eudema, 1990).
 1943: "Sobre la reordinacion de series funcionales y sus aplicaciones", Abhandlungen aus dem Mathematischen Seminar der Universität Hamburg 15(1): 87–51 
 1952 : Introduccion a los Metodos de Estadistica, first part 
 1954 : Introduccion a los Metodos de Estadistica, second part 
 1958: "Sur les lignes de regression", Bulletin de l'Institut International de Statistique 36(3) :64–70 
 1981: Forward to Dictionary of Statistical, Scientific and Technical Terms (Spanish-English) by Hardeo Sahai and Jose Barrios, Wadsworth Publishing  
 1983: "Ramiro Melendreras Gimeno (1944—1983)", Trabajos de Estadisticas y de Investigacion Operativa 34(3): 3–5.
 1994: "The probabilistic revolution" 
 1999: , from Centro de informacion y documentacion cientifica

Awards 
Sixto Rios received the Spanish National Award for Mathematical Research in 1979. He was Academic of the Spanish Royal Academy of Sciences from 1961 until his death, and Doctor Honoris Causa by the University of Oviedo (2000) and the University of Seville (2001).
 
Because of his fundamental contributions to Spanish research, he is considered the father of statistics in Spain.

References
Citations

Bibliography
 Francisco Otero (2008). "Sixto Ríos". Abc (33,811 (July 13, 2008)). ISSN 1136-0143, p. 75.
 Francisco Javier Girón González_Torre (2008). "Sixto Ríos García, Academic of Sciences". El País (11,359 (July 20, 2008)). ISSN 1134-6582, p. 39.

External links
 Sixto Rios dot org

1913 births
2008 deaths
20th-century Spanish mathematicians
Spanish statisticians
Complutense University of Madrid alumni
Academic staff of the University of Valencia
Academic staff of the University of Valladolid
Academic staff of the Complutense University of Madrid
People from Toledo, Spain